Esko Karu (24 April 1946 in Rovaniemi, Finland – 7 December 2003) was a Canadian cross-country skier who competed in the 1968 Winter Olympics.

References

1946 births
2003 deaths
Canadian male biathletes
Canadian male cross-country skiers
Olympic biathletes of Canada
Olympic cross-country skiers of Canada
Biathletes at the 1968 Winter Olympics
Cross-country skiers at the 1968 Winter Olympics
People from Rovaniemi
Finnish emigrants to Canada